Nikol Reznikov (Hebrew: ניקול רזניקוב; born December 27, 1999) is an Israeli model and beauty pageant titleholder who was crowned Miss Israel 2018 and she represented Israel at Miss Universe 2018 pageant.

Life and career 
Reznikov was born in Afula, Israel, to parents Evgeni and Victoria. She studyed Communications in high school. Her father runs an Iscar department store, whereas her mother is a bookkeeper. Her grandmother taught her Russian from a young age. Her mother was born in Tashkent, Uzbek SSR, USSR. Her father was born in Kyiv, Ukrainian SSR, USSR.

In 2020, Reznikov competed as a contestant on Survivor: VIP 3, the tenth season of the Israeli edition of the Survivor franchise.

Pageantry

Miss Israel 2018 
Reznikov was crowned as Miss Israel 2018 pageant. She succeeded outgoing Miss Israel 2017 Adar Gandelsman.

Miss Universe 2018 
Reznikov represented her country at the Miss Universe 2018 pageant in Bangkok, Thailand. She was unplaced.

References

External links 
 missisrael.ynet.co.il
 Miss Israel on Instagram

1999 births
Living people
People from Afula
Israeli beauty pageant winners
Israeli female models
Miss Israel winners
Miss Universe 2018 contestants
Israeli people of Ukrainian-Jewish descent
Israeli people of Uzbekistani-Jewish descent
Israeli people of Soviet descent
Survivor (Israeli TV series) contestants